That Time I Got Reincarnated as a Slime is a 2018 television anime series based on the light novel series written by Fuse. The series follows a man who is killed and reincarnated in another world as a slime named Rimuru. The series is animated by Eight Bit with the staff and cast members reprising their roles. The second season has been announced to be split-cour anime, and the first half scheduled to premiere in October 2020 but has been delayed to January 2021 due to COVID-19. The second half was also delayed from April to July 2021.  The first half aired from January 12 to March 30, 2021, while the second half aired from July 6 to September 21, 2021. The opening theme is "Storyteller" performed by TRUE, and the ending theme is "STORYSEEKER" performed by STEREO DIVE FOUNDATION. The second opening theme is "Like Flames" performed by MindaRyn, and the second ending theme is "Reincarnate" performed by Takuma Terashima. The anime is streaming in Asia (select regions) through Muse Asia YouTube Channel. 


Episode list

International broadcast
The series is available on Netflix and Crunchyroll with both English sub and dub. The series is also available with multilingual subtitles on iQIYI in South East Asia and Taiwan. Muse Asia also streamed the episodes on its YouTube channel.

The Blu-ray of Season 2 will be released on April 19, beginning with Part 1.

Notes

References

External links
 
That Time I Got Reincarnated as a Slime Season 2 at Anime Streaming Search Engine

Anime postponed due to the COVID-19 pandemic
That Time I Got Reincarnated as a Slime episode lists
2021 Japanese television seasons